Aaron Barnes may refer to:
 Aaron Barnes (cricketer) (born 1971), New Zealand cricketer
 Aaron Barnes (footballer) (born 1996), English footballer